Stanley Cohen (November 17, 1922 – February 5, 2020) was an American biochemist who, along with Rita Levi-Montalcini, was awarded the Nobel Prize in Physiology or Medicine in 1986 for the isolation of nerve growth factor and the discovery of epidermal growth factor. He died in February 2020 at the age of 97.

Early life and education
Cohen was born in Brooklyn, New York, on November 17, 1922. He was the son of Fannie (née Feitel) and Louis Cohen, a tailor. His parents were Jewish immigrants. Cohen received his bachelor's degree in 1943 from Brooklyn College, where he had double-majored in chemistry and biology. After working as a bacteriologist at a milk processing plant to earn money, he received his Master of Arts in zoology from Oberlin College in 1945. He earned a doctorate from the department of biochemistry about the metabolism of earthworms at the  University of Michigan in 1948.

Career
His first academic employment was at the University of Colorado studying the metabolism of premature babies. In 1952 he moved to Washington University in St. Louis, working first in the Department of Radiology, learning isotope methodology, and then in the Department of Zoology. Working with Rita Levi-Montalcini, he isolated nerve growth factor. 
He later isolated a protein that could accelerate incisor eruption and eyelid opening in newborn mice, which was renamed epidermal growth factor. He continued research on cellular growth factors after joining the faculty of Vanderbilt University School of Medicine in 1959.

In 1999, Cohen retired from Vanderbilt University.

Awards and legacy
Cohen received the Louisa Gross Horwitz Prize from Columbia University together with Rita Levi-Montalcini in 1983, the Nobel Prize in Physiology or Medicine in 1986 for the isolation of nerve growth factor and the discovery of epidermal growth factor and the National Medal of Science in 1986.
His research on cellular growth factors has proven fundamental to understanding the development of cancer and designing anti-cancer drugs.

His Scopus h-index value was 82 as of March 2022.

References

External links
  including the Nobel Lecture 8 December 1986 Epidermal Growth Factor
 Stanley Cohen Nobel link
 The Official Site of Louisa Gross Horwitz Prize

1922 births
2020 deaths
Nobel laureates in Physiology or Medicine
American Nobel laureates
American biochemists
Members of the United States National Academy of Sciences
James Madison High School (Brooklyn) alumni
Jewish American scientists
Jewish chemists
Jewish physicians
National Medal of Science laureates
Oberlin College alumni
Brooklyn College alumni
Washington University in St. Louis faculty
Nobel laureates affiliated with Missouri
Vanderbilt University faculty
University of Michigan College of Literature, Science, and the Arts alumni
Recipients of the Albert Lasker Award for Basic Medical Research